The Catch Me: Live World Tour (stylized as TVXQ! Live World Tour "Catch Me"), also known as the Catch Me World Tour, was the fourth world concert tour (ninth overall) by South Korean pop duo TVXQ, to support their sixth studio album, Catch Me (2012). The world tour commenced with two shows in Seoul in November 2012. The tour visited seven theatres, arenas, and stadiums from late 2012 through mid-2013 in 8 different countries.

Background

The Catch Me tour marks the group's first tour since their last Asia-wide concert tour, the Mirotic Tour, in February 2009. The two concerts in South Korea will be TVXQ's first concert after the lawsuit between members Jaejoong, Yoochun and Junsu with S.M. Entertainment, and first exclusive concert in four years in Korea. The concert will take place over two days starting from November 17.

The 20,000 tickets for the Seoul concerts were sold out within two minutes of going on sale at 20:00 on October 18. The Beijing concert was played to an audience of 15,000 people.
It was announced on February 19, 2013, by JPM Music on their website and Facebook page that TVXQ would be performing on May 18, 2013, at Stadium Malawati, Shah Alam in Malaysia. It is JPM Music's first K-Pop concert. This is the first TVXQ concert in Malaysia as a duo and first concert after 6 years.

Broadcasts and recordings

TVXQ's first two performances of the tour at the Olympic Gymnastics Arena in Seoul, South Korea was recorded and put on a DVD and a CD. The live album was released on May 22, 2014, comprising two previously unreleased studio tracks: a Korean version of TVXQ's 2011 Japanese digital single "B.U.T. (Be-Au-Ty)" and a Korean remake of their 30th Japanese single, "Toki o Tomete", which was released in 2010. The album debuted at number three on the Gaon Albums Chart and shifted 19,979 units by the end of the month. The DVD version of the tour was released on August 14, 2014.

Setlist
This setlist is representative of the shows in Seoul on November 17–18, 2012 and Hong Kong on January 19, 2013. It does not represent all concerts for the duration of the tour.

"Rising Sun (순수)"
"Getaway"
"Hey! (Don't Bring Me Down)"
"'O'-Jung.Ban.Hap."
"비누처럼 (Like a Soap)"
"How Are You"
"Journey"
Max Changmin solo: "고백 (Confession)" (in Seoul) and "聽海 (Listen to the Sea)" (in Hong Kong)
U-Know Yunho solo: "Honey Funny Bunny"
"Wrong Number"
"I Don't Know" (Korean version)
"Humanoids"
"Purple Line" (Korean version)
"이것만은 알고가 (Before U Go)"
"Destiny"
Medley: "기억을 따라서 (Everlasting)" (Korean version of "Toki o Tomete") / "I Never Let Go" / "약속했던 그때에 (Always There...)" / "지금처럼 (Like Right Now)"
"I Wanna Hold You"
"Here I Stand"
"꿈 (Dream)"
"Catch Me"
"B.U.T (Be-Au-Ty)"
"왜 (Keep Your Head Down)"
"바보 (Unforgettable)"
Encore
 "주문 (Mirotic)"
 "Summer Dream" 
 "Sky"
 "Hi Ya Ya"
 "I'll Be There"

Tour dates

Cancelled shows

Personnel
 Tour organizer: SM Entertainment

References

External links
 TVXQ official homepage  
 TVXQ official Japanese homepage 
 JPM Music

2012 concert tours
2013 concert tours
TVXQ concert tours